Lamottella is a spider genus of the jumping spider family, Salticidae. Its single described species, Lamotella longipes, is found in Guinea.

Description
The female is not yet known.

Taxonomy
The genus is named in honor of Maxime Lamotte, an ecologist and frog specialist who initiated the early expeditions into the Nimba Mountains. The specific name longipes means "long-legged".

References

Salticidae
Spiders of Africa
Endemic fauna of Guinea
Monotypic Salticidae genera
Taxa named by Wanda Wesołowska